Néstor Ariel Fabbri (born 29 April 1968) is an Argentinian former footballer who played as a defender.

Career
Fabbri started playing at the young division of All Boys in 1984, he made his debut for the first team during the 1984–85 season in the Argentine 2nd division. In 1986, he joined first division Racing Club. In 1987 Fabbri was named Player of the Year of Argentina.

After six seasons with Racing, Fabbri spent the 1992 season with Colombian América de Cali, and the 1993 season back to Argentina for Club Atlético Lanús, before moving to Boca Juniors in 1994. Fabbri played with Boca until 1998, when he was transferred to French first division FC Nantes. With Nantes Fabbri won the 1999 and 2000 French Cups, the 1999 and 2001 Champion's Trophies, and the 2001 French Championship.

In 2002, Fabbri moved to En Avant de Guingamp, at that time in the French first division. He played one season for Guingamp with teammates like Didier Drogba or Florent Malouda and the team finished in seventh place. He returned to Argentina, first to play for Estudiantes in 2003, and then in 2004 to his first team All Boys, where he retired.

With the Argentina national football team, "La Tota" Fabbri played 21 matches, including the 1990 FIFA World Cup, and scored 1 goal.

Personal life
Fabbri worked as the agent of his nephew Jonathan Calleri, who played football as a forward.

References

External links

1968 births
Living people
Footballers from Buenos Aires
Argentine people of Italian descent
Racing Club de Avellaneda footballers
Boca Juniors footballers
Estudiantes de La Plata footballers
Club Atlético Lanús footballers
América de Cali footballers
FC Nantes players
Expatriate footballers in France
En Avant Guingamp players
All Boys footballers
Association football defenders
Argentine footballers
1990 FIFA World Cup players
1995 King Fahd Cup players
1995 Copa América players
Argentine expatriate sportspeople in Colombia
Argentina international footballers
Footballers at the 1988 Summer Olympics
Olympic footballers of Argentina
Argentine Primera División players
Ligue 1 players
Categoría Primera A players
Argentine expatriate footballers
Expatriate footballers in Colombia
Argentine expatriate sportspeople in France
Pan American Games bronze medalists for Argentina
Medalists at the 1987 Pan American Games
Footballers at the 1987 Pan American Games
Pan American Games medalists in football